Mycocalicium is a genus of fungi in the family Mycocaliciaceae. The genus was circumscribed by Finnish lichenologist Edvard August Vainio in 1890.

Species
Mycocalicium chiodectonicola  – Panama
Mycocalicium enterographicola  – Brazil
Mycocalicium hyaloparvicellulum  – Italy
Mycocalicium llimonae  – Iberian Peninsula
Mycocalicium rapax  – Africa
Mycocalicium subtile

References

Eurotiomycetes
Taxa named by Edvard August Vainio
Lichenicolous fungi
Taxa described in 1890
Eurotiomycetes genera